Chris McAsey (born 1962) is  a former Australian rules footballer who played with St Kilda in the Victorian Football League (VFL).

After retiring as a footballer McAsey became a journalist and writer, including for Lonely Planet, and then a digital content producer for AFL.com.au and Telstra media.

His son, Fischer McAsey was drafted in the 2019 AFL draft by Adelaide.

Notes

External links 
		

Living people
1962 births
Australian rules footballers from Victoria (Australia)
St Kilda Football Club players
Australian travel writers
Ormond Amateur Football Club players